The Association for Computing Machinery's Special Interest Group on Software Engineering  provides a forum for computing professionals from industry, government and academia to examine principles, practices, and new research results in software engineering. 

SIGSOFT focuses on issues related to all aspects of software development and maintenance, with emphasis on requirements, specification and design, software architecture, validation, verification, debugging, software safety, software processes, software management, measurement, user interfaces, configuration management, software engineering environments, and CASE tools.

SIGSOFT (co-)sponsors conferences and symposia including the International Conference on Software Engineering (ICSE), the ACM Joint European Software Engineering Conference and Symposium on the Foundations of Software Engineering (ESEC/FSE) and other events.

SIGSOFT publishes the informal bimonthly newsletter Software Engineering Notes (SEN) newsletter with papers, reports and other material related to the cost-effective, timely development and maintenance of high-quality software.

SIGSOFT's mission is to improve the ability to engineer software by stimulating interaction among practitioners, researchers, and educators; by fostering the professional development of software engineers; and by representing software engineers to professional, legal, and political entities.

References

External links 
 SIGSOFT website

Association for Computing Machinery Special Interest Groups
Software engineering organizations
Organizations established in 1976